It Ain't Easy is the fourth album by American rock band Three Dog Night, released in 1970.

Title and packaging 
According to lead singer Chuck Negron's book Three Dog Nightmare, the album's working title was The Wizards of Orange, with a cover featuring the band's members wearing orange make-up and posing in the nude. The band's record company, ABC/Dunhill, rejected the original album title and cover art, although some configurations of their first "greatest hits" album, 1971's Golden Bisquits, would later be packaged using It Ain't Easys original cover photo.

 Critical reception 

Reviewing in Christgau's Record Guide: Rock Albums of the Seventies (1981), Robert Christgau wrote: "Admitting it won't gain me any of the hip cachet I crave, but I admired and enjoyed this group's first LP. I found the second mediocre and the live job that followed it wretchedly excessive, but this one—their fourth in just fourteen months—gets back: exemplary song-finding and not too much plastic-soul melon-mouthing or preening vocal pyrotechnique. Highlights: the hit version of Randy Newman's 'Mama Told Me Not to Come,' with just the right admixture of high-spirited schlock to turn it into the AM giant it deserves to be, and a departure from pre-Beatles times called "Good Feeling (1957)."

Track listing
Side one
"Woman" (Andy Fraser, Paul Rodgers) – 4:40
"Cowboy" (Randy Newman) – 3:42
"It Ain't Easy" (Ron Davies) – 2:46
"Out in the Country" (Roger Nichols, Paul Williams) – 3:08
"Good Feeling 1957" (Alan Brackett, John Merrill) – 3:46

Side two
"Rock and Roll Widow" (Danny Hutton, Chuck Negron, Cory Wells, Mike Allsup, Jimmy Greenspoon, Joe Schermie, Floyd Sneed) – 2:56
"Mama Told Me (Not to Come)" (Newman) – 3:18
"Your Song" (Elton John, Bernie Taupin) – 4:01
"Good Time Living" (Barry Mann, Cynthia Weil) – 4:06

Personnel
 Musicians 
Cory Wells – lead vocals (tracks A1, A3, B2, A4-group unison), background vocals
Chuck Negron – lead vocals (tracks A2, A5, A4-group unison), background vocals 
Danny Hutton – lead vocals (track B3, A4-group unison), background vocals
Mike Allsup – guitar
Joe Schermie – bass guitar
Floyd Sneed – drums
Jimmy Greenspoon – keyboards

 Production 
Producer: Richard Podolor
Engineer: Bill Cooper
Arranger: Three Dog Night
Roadie, lighting: Dennis Albro
Roadie, sound: Lee Carlton
Cal Schenkel - design
Ed Caraeff - photography

ChartsAlbum – Billboard (United States)Singles''' – Billboard'' (United States)

Certifications

References

Three Dog Night albums
1970 albums
Albums produced by Richard Podolor
Dunhill Records albums
MCA Records albums
Probe Records albums